Hookers on Davie is a Canadian documentary film, directed by Janis Cole and Holly Dale and released in 1984. A portrait of a number of women, both cisgender and transgender, who work as prostitutes on Davie Street in Vancouver, British Columbia, the film profiles them in the context of the early campaign to "clean up" the street during the mayoralty of Mike Harcourt.

The film premiered at the Bloor Cinema in Toronto, Ontario on April 5, 1984.

The film received a Genie Award nomination for Best Feature Length Documentary at the 6th Genie Awards in 1985. It also won the award for Best Documentary at the 1984 Chicago International Film Festival.

References

External links
 
 Hookers on Davie - Vancouver Archives

1984 films
1984 documentary films
1984 LGBT-related films
Canadian documentary films
Canadian LGBT-related films
Documentary films about prostitution in Canada
Transgender-related documentary films
Films shot in Vancouver
Films set in Vancouver
Films directed by Janis Cole and Holly Dale
Women in British Columbia
English-language Canadian films
1980s English-language films
1980s Canadian films